This list of lantern slide collections provides an overview of collections held in institutions internationally. The magic lantern was a very popular medium, particularly so from the 18th to the early 20th Century. There are many collections which remain uncatalogued. As a result, this list is likely to continue to expand as more information is made available.

Terminology
The terms "lantern slides" and "magic lantern" are used here as umbrella terms for describing objects related to the historical art of projection. Various terms can be found across history, disciplines, intended audiences or for descriptions of specific formats of slides and types of lanterns. In English, historical terms for "lantern slides" are "transparencies", "photographic transparencies", "slides" and "magic lantern slides". Alternative terms for magic lanterns include "optical lantern", "sciopticon", "stereopticon", "projection apparatus", "toy lantern" and more. The Lucerna Magic Lantern Web Resource  and the Magic Lantern and Lantern Slide Catalog Collection on Media History Digital Library  offer sources that display the range of terminology used. This list welcomes all references, independent of the term that the respective collection uses to describe its material.

About the collections
The majority of the collections included form part of museum, archive, and library collections which are made available to researchers either by appointment or through digital platforms. Magic, or optical, lantern slides vary in date, subject, format and use, and the collections listed reflect that variation. The collections are arranged by country, specifying collection name and description where known. Collections owned by private individuals are not listed.

Australia

Belgium

Canada

Denmark

France

Germany

Italy

Netherlands

Spain

South Africa

United Kingdom

United States

References 

Lists of universities and colleges